The 2004 winners of the Torneo di Viareggio (in English, the Viareggio Tournament, officially the Viareggio Cup World Football Tournament Coppa Carnevale), the annual youth football tournament held in Viareggio, Tuscany, are listed below.

Format

The 40 teams are seeded in 10 pools, split up into 5-pool groups. Each team from a pool meets the others in a single tie. The winning club from each pool and three best runners-up from both group A and group B progress to the final knockout stage. All matches in the final rounds are single tie. The Round of 16 envisions penalties and no extra time, while the rest of the final round matches include 30 minutes extra time with Golden goal rule and penalties to be played if the draw between teams still holds. Semifinal losing teams play 3rd-place final with penalties after regular time. The winning sides play the final with extra time, no Golden goal rule and repeat the match if the draw holds.

Participating teams
Italian teams

  Atalanta
  Bari
  Benevento
  Catanzaro
  Cittadella
  Empoli
  Fiorentina
  Genoa
  Gubbio
  Inter Milan
  Juventus
  Lazio
  Livorno
  Messina
  Milan
  Modena
  Napoli
  Parma
  Perugia
  Reggiana
  Roma
  Ternana
  Torino
  Venezia
  Vicenza

European teams

  Bayern Munich
  Maccabi Haifa
  OFK Belgrade
  Partizan
  Werder Bremen
  Obilić
  Slavia Prague
  Galatasaray

African Team
  Cameroon Douala

American teams

  New York United
  Arsenal de Sarandí
  Costa Rica United
  Desportiva Capixaba
  Londrina
  Desp. Camboriuense

Group stage

Group 1

Group 2

Group 3

Group 4

Group 5

Group 6

Group 7

Group 8

Group 9

Group 10

Knockout stage

Champions

Notes

External links
 Official Site (Italian)
 Results on RSSSF.com

2004
2003–04 in Italian football
2003–04 in German football
2003–04 in Israeli football
2003–04 in Serbian football
2003–04 in Czech football
2003–04 in Turkish football
2003–04 in Argentine football
2004 in Cameroonian football
2004 in Brazilian football
2004 in American soccer